Jukka Ruhanen (born 16 April 1971) is a retired Finnish footballer who played as a midfielder.

Club career
Ruhanen began his career at hometown club MP, making three appearances in the 1987 Mestaruussarja season. Over the course of seven seasons at MP, Ruhanen made 152 league appearances, scoring 32 goals for the club. Ahead of the 1994 Veikkausliiga season, Ruhanen signed for FC Jazz. In a two season stint at Jazz, Ruhanen scored 15 goals across 48 Veikkausliiga games, as Jazz finished second in both campaigns. In 1996, Ruhanen signed for FC Haka. In 1997, Ruhanen scored 15 goals in 24 Ykkönen appearances, as the club gained promotion back to the Veikkausliiga, as well as winning the 1997 Finnish Cup. Ruhanen was a regular in Haka's team as the club won three consecutive Veikkausliiga titles, as well as winning another Finnish Cup in 2002.

On 3 January 2003, Ruhanen signed for English club Canvey Island, as the club fought for promotion from the Isthmian League. Ruhanen made six league appearances for Canvey Island, before being released in March 2003. Upon his release from the club, Ruhanen returned to his native Finland, signing for MyPa. Ruhanen saw out the rest of the season at MyPa, making 14 Veikkausliiga appearances. In 2004, Ruhanen dropped down to the fourth tier of Finnish football, signing for SoVo, as the club won promotion to the Kakkonen. Ruhanen retired in 2005.

International career
Ruhanen represented Finland at under-21 level. On 12 February 1992, Ruhanen made his debut for Finland in a 1–1 draw against Turkey. On 21 February 1993, Ruhanen scored his first goal for Finland in a 3–0 win against Lithuania. In total, Ruhanen made 15 appearances for Finland, scoring three times.

International goals
Scores and results list Finland's goal tally first.

References

1971 births
Living people
Finnish footballers
People from Mikkeli
Mikkelin Palloilijat players
FC Jazz players
FC Haka players
Canvey Island F.C. players
Myllykosken Pallo −47 players
Association football midfielders
Finnish expatriate footballers
Expatriate footballers in England
Finnish expatriate sportspeople in England
Finland under-21 international footballers
Finland international footballers
Veikkausliiga players
Ykkönen players
Isthmian League players
Kolmonen players
Kakkonen players